Stefano Soatto is professor of computer science at the University of California, Los Angeles (UCLA), in Los Angeles, CA, where he is also professor of electrical engineering and founding director of the UCLA Vision Lab.

Academic biography 

Soatto obtained his D. Eng. in electrical engineering, cum laude, from the University of Padua in 1992, was an EAP Fellow at the University of California, Berkeley in 1990–1991, and received his Ph.D. in control and dynamical systems from the California Institute of Technology in 1996 with dissertation “A Geometric Approach to Dynamic Vision”. In 1996-97 he was a postdoctoral scholar at Harvard University, and subsequently held positions as assistant and associate professor of electrical engineering and biomedical engineering at Washington University in St. Louis, and of mathematics and computer science at the University of Udine, Italy. He has been at UCLA since 2000.

Research 
Soatto’s research focuses on computer vision, machine learning and robotics. He co-developed optimal algorithms for structure from motion (SFM, or visual SLAM, simultaneous localization and mapping, in robotics; Best Paper Award at CVPR 1998), characterized its ambiguities (David Marr Prize at ICCV 1999), also characterized the identifiability and observability of visual-inertial sensor fusion (Best Paper Award at ICRA 2015). His research focus is the development of representations, that are functions of the data that capture their informative content and discard irrelevant variability in the data (a generalized form of ‘noise’ or ‘clutter’).
Soatto’s lab first to demonstrate real-time SFM and augmented reality (AR) on commodity hardware in live demos at CVPR 2000, ICCV 2001, and ECCV 2002. He also co-led the UCLA-Golem Team in the second DARPA Grand Challenge for autonomous vehicles, with Emilio Frazzoli (co-founder of NuTonomy), and Amnon Shashua (co-founder of Mobileye).

Recognition
Soatto was named Fellow of the Institute of Electrical and Electronics Engineers (IEEE) in 2013 for contributions to dynamic visual processes. He received the David Marr Prize in Computer Vision in 1999. He was named to the 2022 class of ACM Fellows, "for contributions to the foundations and applications of visual geometry and visual representations learning".

References

External links 
 Stefano Soatto professional home page

Fellow Members of the IEEE
Fellows of the Association for Computing Machinery
Living people
Italian computer scientists
University of Padua alumni
California Institute of Technology alumni
Computer vision researchers
Machine learning researchers
Computer scientists
Year of birth missing (living people)
University of California, Los Angeles faculty
Washington University in St. Louis faculty
Academic staff of the University of Udine
University of California, Berkeley fellows